Monica Lynn Maxwell (born December 21, 1976) is a former women's basketball player and coach.

Playing career
She played her high school basketball at East Chicago Central High School leading the Lady Cardinals to a 22–1 record during her senior season in 1995 and was a finalist for the Naismith Award recognizing the top prep player in the nation. She played for the Louisiana Tech Lady Techsters basketball team from 1995 to 1999. She ended her career at LA Tech ranked fourth on the school's all-time career three-point field goals list and third in three-point field goals attempted. She played in two NCAA Final Fours with the Lady Techsters. Maxwell graduated from Louisiana Tech University in 1999 with a degree in computer information systems. She played her rookie season in the WNBA with the Washington Mystics. She played her final 3 seasons with the Indiana Fever. In 2000, Maxwell led the Eastern Conference with 62 three-pointers made. She also set a then-franchise record with 29 points against the Los Angeles Sparks on June 22, 2000. In the off-season, she played for the WNBL's Springfield Spirit.

USA Basketball
Maxwell competed with USA Basketball as a member of the 1997 Jones Cup Team that won the silver medal in Taipei. Several of the games were close, with the USA team winning four games by six points or fewer, including an overtime game in the semifinal match against Japan. The gold medal game against South Korea was also close, but the USA fell 76–71 to claim the silver medal for the event. Maxwell averaged 5.3 points per game.

Coaching career
Maxwell served as an assistant coach at Pike High School in Indianapolis, Indiana from 2002 to 2005. She went on to serve as a women's basketball assistant coach at Tulane University from 2005 to 2006.

References

1976 births
Living people
African-American basketball players
American women's basketball players
Basketball players from Indiana
Indiana Fever players
Louisiana Tech Lady Techsters basketball players
Small forwards
Washington Mystics players
American women's basketball coaches
21st-century African-American sportspeople
21st-century African-American women
20th-century African-American sportspeople
20th-century African-American women